Fincham is a village and civil parish the English county of Norfolk.

History
Fincham's name is of Anglo-Saxon origin and derives from the Old English for a homestead or settlement with an abundance of finches.

Fincham was the site of a major Roman thoroughfare, meaning the parish has yielded numerous Roman artefacts including three separate hoards of silver coins, a curious figure of a hare and hound and a bust of Jupiter. The foundations of a Roman building have been discovered in the north of the parish, which have been excavated by Norfolk Heritage.

The parish has also yielded many artefacts from the Anglo-Saxon period including rare coins dating from the reign of King Eadwold and another that was minted in Maastricht. With later coins found dating from the reigns of King Cnut and Æthelred the Unready.

In the Domesday Book, Fincham is listed as a settlement of 164 households in the hundred of Clackclose. In 1086, the village was divided between the East Anglian estates of William de Warenne, Hermer de Ferrers, Bury St Edmunds Abbey, St. Etheldreda's Abbey, Ralph Baynard and Reginald, son of Ivo.

Fincham Hall is a manor-house dating from the Fifteenth and Sixteenth Centuries, with an earlier octagonal brick tower. Today, the hall is available for tourists to rent on Airbnb. Talbot Hall was built in Eighteenth Century and was notable for hosting an impressive collection of orchids currently displayed in Kew Botanical Gardens.

Geography
According to the 2011 Census, Fincham has a population of 496 residents living in 239 households.

Fincham falls within the constituency of South West Norfolk and is represented at Parliament by Lizz Truss of the Conservative Party. For the purposes of local government, the parish falls within the district of King's Lynn and West Norfolk.

Most of Fincham village is a dedicated conservation area due to its distinct rural character.

St. Martin's Church
Fincham's parish church is dedicated to Saint Martin, with the exterior of the church dating from the Fifteenth Century and the interior being the remains of an extensive Nineteenth Century restoration. St. Martin's font is famous throughout Norfolk due to the fact it stands on four separate legs and depicts scenes from The Gospel of Christ. Fincham once had another church, dedicated to Saint Michael, but this fell into disuse and was subsequently demolished in the mid-Nineteenth Century.

Amenities
Though at one time Fincham was home to five public houses, today only one remains- 'The Swan'. The pub has stood on its current site since the late-Eighteenth Century and today operates as a freehouse.

Fincham Memorial Hall is located close to the Village Green, and is the venue for monthly car boot sales and the annual Village Fete. The hall has been severely damaged twice in recent memory, once after an illegal rave and secondly by flooding in Winter of 2010.

As of 2016, the village was home to a petrol station and a hairdressing salon.

In 2005, the Fincham Chorus was formed by people from Fincham and the surrounding area. To date, they have staged several concerts and performed at one wedding, as well as taking part in the Christmas carol services. To date, they have raised over £10,000 for St Martin's Church restoration fund.

War Memorial
Fincham's war memorial takes the form of a square plinth topped with a crucifix, made from Portland stone and located inside St. Martin's Churchyard. The memorial was restored in 2012 with the partition chains around the memorial being stolen in 2013 and subsequently replaced. The memorial lists the following names for the First World War:

 Sgt. George Harvey (1888-1918), 1st Bn., Royal Norfolk Regiment
 L-Cpl Jack Laws (1881-1916), East Yorkshire Regiment
 L-Cpl. Ernest Lankfer (1898-1917), 18th Bn., Highland Light Infantry
 L-Cpl. Sydney Bacon (1887-1914), 1st Bn., Royal Norfolk Regiment
 Gnr. Bert Sculpher (1897-1917), 322nd (Siege) Battery, Royal Garrison Artillery
 Pvt. A. Thomas Utting (1894-1916), 4th Bn., Bedfordshire Regiment
 Pvt. George Nelson (1895-1918), 2nd Bn., Cheshire Regiment
 Pvt. Isaac Sculpher (1883-1915), 1st Bn., Coldstream Guards
 Pvt. Harry Jude (1877-1916), 1st Bn., East Surrey Regiment
 Pvt. Robert Secker (1897-1915), 1st Bn., Essex Regiment
 Pvt. Albert Bly (1888-1915), 1st Bn., Royal Norfolk Regiment
 Pvt. Bert Bell (1894-1917), 7th Bn., Royal Norfolk Regt.
 Pvt. Ralph Bacon (1893-1918), 8th Bn., Royal Norfolk Regt.
 Pvt. Arthur Elliot (1888-1917), 8th Bn., Royal Norfolk Regt.
 Pvt. Charles Wilding (1883-1915), 8th Bn., Royal Norfolk Regt.
 Pvt. Jonathan A. Bywater (1886-1915), 9th Bn., Royal Norfolk Regt.
 Pvt. Benjamin Barker (1883-1917), 6th Bn., Northamptonshire Regiment
 Pvt. Arthur Cater (1897-1918), 6th Bn., Northamptonshire Regt.
 Pvt. R. Reginald Bellham (1892-1916), 2nd Bn., Royal Sussex Regiment
 Pvt. Frederick W. E. Upshaw (1891-1918), 2/5th Bn., West Yorkshire Regiment
 Rfn. Percy W. Bacon (1897-1918), 13th Bn., King's Royal Rifle Corps
 Rfn. John Johnson (1895-1916), 13th Bn., K.R.R.C.

References

External links 
 - Parish Council Website
St. Martin's - A church near you
Memorial Hall
History Society
Fincham and the Finchams

Villages in Norfolk
King's Lynn and West Norfolk
Civil parishes in Norfolk